Kostromino is a rural locality (a village) in Novlenskoye Rural Settlement, Vologodsky District, Vologda Oblast, Russia. The population was 46 as of 2002.

Geography 
Kostromino is located 74 km northwest of Vologda (the district's administrative centre) by road. Ignachevo is the nearest rural locality.

References 

Rural localities in Vologodsky District